Kakrala is a city and municipal board in Badaun district in Indian state of Uttar Pradesh.

Geography 
This place is situated in Budaun, Uttar Pradesh, India, its geographical coordinates are 27° 54' 0" North, 79° 12' 0" East and its original name (with diacritics) is Kakrāla.

Demographics
 India census, Kakrala had a population of 105000. Males constituted 52.71% of the population while females constituted 47.28%. Kakrala has an average literacy rate of 57.96%: male literacy is 61.69%, and female literacy is 53.76%.

References

Cities and towns in Budaun district